Steven Poon Kwok-lim, BBS, JP (born 9 July 1943) was an appointed member of the Legislative Council of Hong Kong (1991–95) and member of the Kowloon City District Board (1994–99) for Kowloon Tong.

Poon was born in Guangzhou.  He was a member of the Hong Kong Stock Exchange, Hong Kong University of Science and Technology and Hong Kong Institution of Engineers.

References

1943 births
Living people
Liberal Party (Hong Kong) politicians
Alumni of the University of Hong Kong
National Taiwan University alumni
District councillors of Kowloon City District
HK LegCo Members 1991–1995
Hong Kong Affairs Advisors
Members of the Selection Committee of Hong Kong
Recipients of the Bronze Bauhinia Star